Aeroenlaces Nacionales, S.A. de C.V., trading as Viva Aerobus, is a Mexican low-cost airline fully owned by the largest bus company group in Mexico, IAMSA, and was co-founded by and invested in by Irelandia Aviation. Based in Monterrey International Airport, Mexico. Viva Aerobus started operations in November 2006 with only one nonstop service and, currently, it already offers more than 130 routes in more than 40 destinations serving Colombia, Cuba, the United States and Mexico with more than 100,000 flights per year. Its six bases are located in Cancun, Mexico City, Mérida, Guadalajara, Monterrey and Tijuana.

History
VivaAerobús commenced operations on November 30, 2006, with its hub at Monterrey International Airport, in Monterrey, Mexico, and with an initial investment of $50 million and two Boeing 737-300 aircraft. VivaAerobús was co-owned by Ryanair's Irelandia Aviation and the Mexican bus company IAMSA. Ryanair joined with Alexander Maurice Mason of Kite Investments to establish "RyanMex" to facilitate the Irish family's investment in the Mexican airline. IAMSA has showed interest in developing a new stage of transportation after its successful bus market in Mexico, and Irelandia has been actively investigating the market opportunity, leading to the companies' partnership to form a Mexican low-cost carrier. Irelandia held a 49 percent of shares in the airline, while IAMSA had the remaining majority stake.

The airline initially connected Monterrey to a number of Mexican domestic locations and, in July 2007, publicly confirmed its intention to open its first base outside of Mexico and first US destination in Austin, Texas (although it ultimately pulled out of Austin in 2009).

VivaAerobús fares were intended to undercut traditional Mexican carriers by up to 50 percent, in a change of the industry that started with the arrival of the country's second generation of low-cost airlines (Avolar, MexicanaClick, Interjet, Volaris) and the privatization of Mexicana de Aviación, one of the two top national airlines. The airline started operations at Monterrey International Airport in November 2006 with two aircraft and one nonstop service connecting Monterrey to Tijuana, under the leadership of Mike Szucs as its CEO. A year after its foundation, in October 2007, Viva Aerobus had already transported one million passengers. Later, Donald Rogers became Viva Aerobus CEO in May 2009, year when Guadalajara became the airline's second base. In June 2010 the airline's leadership was assigned to Juan Carlos Zuazua, current CEO . Expansion continued and the airline established Mexico City, Cancun, Tijuana and Mérida as its new bases in 2011, 2013, 2015 and 2022, respectively.

On November 5, 2007, the airline received approval from the US Department of Transportation to operate to Austin-Bergstrom International Airport, initially serving the Mexican destinations of Cancún, Monterrey, Guadalajara and León. Flights to the South Terminal Austin began on May 1, 2008.

On May 16, 2009, VivaAerobús stated it would cease passenger operations at Austin-Bergstrom International Airport on May 31, 2009.  The airline blamed the pullout in part on an outbreak of swine flu, which caused an unprecedented decrease in demand for service. The company began to fly between Monterrey and Las Vegas in the summer of 2009.

In November 2009, the airline announced it had applied to commence operations between Hermosillo and Las Vegas beginning in March 2010.

In April 2010, the airline finally began serving Mexico's capital with two flights, one from Monterrey and the other from Guadalajara. It also started serving Houston's George Bush Intercontinental Airport. However, the airline planned to serve Houston Hobby Airport on completion of that airport's new terminal in 2015.

In 2010, the airline opened a focus city at Mexico City International Airport on October 1 after Mexicana ceased operations. VivaAerobús switched Mexico City from focus city into a hub on April 1, 2011, beginning more destinations from the airport.

On July 26, 2011, the airline received approval to fly to Chicago-Midway International Airport. On August 15 the same year, VivaAerobús announced it would begin round-trip service between San Antonio (SAT) and Monterrey (MTY), Mexico starting that November. On April 13, 2012, the airline ceased flights to Chicago Midway. On December 7, 2019, the airline resumed flying from Monterrey to Chicago, but this time via O'Hare International Airport. In addition, the airline flew to Morelia, Guadalajara, Leon and Zacatecas from Chicago-O'Hare for the 2019-2020 winter season.

In October 2013, VivaAerobús has signed an agreement to order 52 Airbus A320 aircraft for $5.1 billion, making it the largest order by a Latin American carrier.

On May 15, 2014, VivaAerobús received and started using Airbus A320s. It continued using Boeing 737s until the end of 2016, when it began operating an all Airbus fleet.

In October 2014, VivaAerobús began nonstop flights from Ciudad Juárez (Chihuahua State) to Mexico City, León, and Hermosillo. In 2015, the airline launched flights to Dallas–Fort Worth from several Mexican cities. The service was terminated in October 2015.

As of December 8, 2016, IAMSA has acquired a 100 percent stake of the company after Irelandia Aviation sold its 49% stake to the company following regulatory approval.

On December 17, 2017, VivaAerobús began non-stop service to Los Angeles International Airport from Guadalajara International Airport.

In 2018, VivaAerobús began non-stop service to Las Vegas and New York City from Mexico City International Airport.

VivaAerobús announced the launch of its cargo subsidiary, Viva Cargo, in January 2020.

In late-October 2021, VivaAerobús has announced an interline agreement with Viva Air Colombia which took effect on November 1, 2021.

In December 2021, VivaAerobús has partnered with Allegiant Air to form an alliance and expand low-budget services between the United States and Mexico. Subject to regulatory approval, the alliance is planned to launch in 2023.

In early August 2022, VivaAerobús announced a codeshare agreement with Iberia to better connect passengers going between Mexico and Spain.

Destinations

Corporate affairs
The corporate headquarters is in Terminal C of Monterrey International Airport in Apodaca, Nuevo Leon. It occupies space in the terminal's cargo zone.

In-flight services
, VivaAerobús has a buy on board program offering food and drinks for purchase.

Bus services
VivaAerobús operates a shuttle bus from downtown El Paso, Texas to Abraham González International Airport in Ciudad Juárez, Chihuahua.

VivaAerobús operated a bus shuttle between Austin-Bergstrom International Airport South Terminal and the Omnibus Mexicanos Bus Terminal in eastern Houston in addition to a bus shuttle between the Austin airport and the Omnibus Mexicanos Bus Terminal in downtown San Antonio for passengers on flights going to and from Cancún and Monterrey.

Fleet
In its beginnings, Viva Aerobus operated with a fleet integrated by Boeing 737-300 aircraft. In October 2016, the airline took ownership of the first PW1100-JM-powered Airbus A320neo. This was part of an order placed with Airbus in October 2013 for 52 Airbus A320 family aircraft, including 12 A320ceos, at the time the largest number of aircraft ordered by a Mexican airline directly from Airbus. The first A320ceo had been delivered in May 2015. At the time of receiving the first A320ceo the carrier operated a fleet of six leased A320s and Boeing 737-300 aircraft.

VivaAerobús amended and existing order with Airbus in July 2018 to include the Airbus A321neo, of which 41 were included in the new orderbook. The carrier took delivery of the first of these aircraft in June 2020.

As of January 2022, Viva Aerobus reported the youngest fleet in Mexico and the second youngest fleet in North America with an average age of 5 years, integrated, by 55 Airbus: 40 Airbus A320 and 15 Airbus A321.

Sponsorships 

 Sports sponsorships. To promote physical activity and healthy recreation, Viva Aerobus has been the official sponsor of the Atlas, Tigres UANL and America soccer teams; as well as Los Tomateros de Culiacan and Sultanes de Monterrey baseball teams. Internationally, it is also a sponsor of the NBA team Los San Antonio Spurs and the Las Vegas Raiders of the NFL.

References

External links

 Viva Aerobus Official Site 
 Viva AeroBus fleet details

Airlines of Mexico
Low-cost carriers
Airlines established in 2006
Companies based in Mexico City
Mexican brands
2006 establishments in Mexico